The Carte Imagine'R is a travel pass for students and young people between the ages of 12 and 25 years to travel in the Paris Île-de-France region.

Valid for one year, it allows travel on public transport such as the Métro, buses, or the RER. 

During the week, its users can freely travel in the zones defined by its subscription. On weekends, national holidays and during the school holidays, the card is 'de-zoned', authorizing its carrier to travel in all zones of the Paris Île-de-France region. 

The card also allows the holder to claim various reductions on other services.

Since 2003, the carte Imagine'R is loaded onto a Navigo card, which must be scanned at a card reader with each journey.

Fare collection systems in France
Transport in Île-de-France